Goodenia gloeophylla  is a species of flowering plant in the family Goodeniaceae and is endemic to northern Australia. It is an erect, slightly woody under-shrub with linear to narrow elliptic, toothed or narrowly-lobed leaves, and racemes of pale to deep purple flowers.

Description

Taxonomy and naming
Goodenia gloeophylla was first formally described in 1990 by Roger Charles Carolin in the journal Telopea from material collected in 1971 by David Eric Symon near Kalumburu. The specific epithet (gloeophylla) means "sticky-leaved".

Distribution and habitat
This goodenia grows in sandy soil in heath and scrub in the northern Kimberley region of Western Australia and in the northern part of the Northern Territory.

Conservation status
Goodenia gloeophylla is classified as "Priority Two" by the Western Australian Government Department of Parks and Wildlife meaning that it is poorly known and from only one or a few locations.

References

gloeophylla
Eudicots of Western Australia
Flora of the Northern Territory
Plants described in 1990
Taxa named by Roger Charles Carolin
Endemic flora of Western Australia